Tato Grigalashvili (born 1 December 1999) is a Georgian judoka. He won the silver medal in the men's 81 kg at the 2021 World Judo Championships held in Budapest, Hungary. He is also a two-time gold medalist in his event at the European Judo Championships.

Career
In 2018, he won one of the bronze medals in the men's 81 kg event at the Judo Grand Prix Antalya held in Antalya, Turkey.

The following year, he won one of the bronze medals in this event at the 2019 Judo Grand Prix Tbilisi held in Tbilisi, Georgia. In the same year, he won one of the bronze medals in the men's 81 kg event at the 2019 Summer Universiade held in Naples, Italy.

In 2020, he won the gold medal in the men's 81 kg event at the Judo Grand Slam Düsseldorf held in Düsseldorf, Germany. He is also the gold medalist in the men's 81 kg event at the 2020 European Judo Championships held in Prague, Czech Republic.

In 2021, he won the gold medal in his event at the Judo World Masters held in Doha, Qatar.

He won the silver medal in his event at the 2022 Judo Grand Slam Paris held in Paris, France. He won the gold medal in the men's 81 kg event at the 2022 European Judo Championships held in Sofia, Bulgaria.

Achievements

References

External links
 
 

Living people
1999 births
Place of birth missing (living people)
Male judoka from Georgia (country)
Universiade medalists in judo
Universiade medalists for Georgia (country)
Medalists at the 2019 Summer Universiade
Judoka at the 2020 Summer Olympics
Olympic judoka of Georgia (country)
21st-century people from Georgia (country)